Higbie is a surname. Notable people with the surname include:

Barbara Higbie (born 1958), American pianist, composer, violinist, singer-songwriter and multi-instrumentalist
Carl Higbie (born 1983), American former Navy SEAL and political advisor
Richard Higbie (1857–1900), American politician